UGREEN (绿联) is a Chinese consumer electronics brand owned by Ugreen Group Limited and based in Shenzhen, Guangdong. The brand was established by Zhang Qingsen in Shenzhen in 2012, and specialises in USB hardware such as cables and AC adapters, as well as other categories of consumer electronics such as audio equipment.

References 

2012 establishments
Consumer electronics brands